Argyresthia sorbiella is a moth of the family Yponomeutidae. It is found in Northern Europe and Central Europe.

The wingspan is .The head and thorax are whitish. Forewings are  shining whitish, on costal half strigulated with light golden-brown ; a transverse dorsal mark at 1/3, an outwardly oblique streak from middle of dorsum, and an indistinct tornal mark golden-brown. Hindwings are grey.

The moth flies from May to August.

The larvae feed on Sorbus aucuparia and Sorbus aria.

References

Notes
The flight season refers to Belgium and The Netherlands. This may vary in other parts of the range.

Moths described in 1833
Argyresthia
Moths of Europe